The purpose of this page is to catalog new, interesting, and useful identities related to number-theoretic divisor sums, i.e., sums of an arithmetic function over the divisors of a natural number , or equivalently the Dirichlet convolution of an arithmetic function  with one:

We also define periodic variants of these divisor sums with respect to the greatest common divisor function in the form of

Naturally, some of the most interesting examples of such identities result when considering the average order summatory functions over an arithmetic function  defined as a divisor sum of another arithmetic function . Particular examples of divisor sums involving special arithmetic functions and special Dirichlet convolutions of arithmetic functions can be found on the following pages: 
here, here, here, here, and here.

Average order sum identities

Interchange of summation identities

The following identities are the primary motivation for creating this topics page. These identities do not appear to be well-known, or at least well-documented, and are extremely useful tools to have at hand in some applications. A more common special case of the first summation below is referenced here.

  
  
  
  
 

In general, these identities are collected from the so-called "rarities and b-sides" of both well established and semi-obscure analytic number theory notes and techniques and the papers and work of the contributors. The identities themselves are not difficult to prove and are an exercise in standard manipulations of series inversion and divisor sums. Therefore, we omit their proofs here.

The convolution method

The convolution method is a general technique for estimating average order sums of the form

where the multiplicative function f can be written as a convolution of the form  for suitable, application-defined arithmetic functions u and v. A short survey of this method can be found here.

Periodic divisor sums

An arithmetic function is periodic (mod k), or k-periodic, if  for all . Particular examples of k-periodic number theoretic functions are the Dirichlet characters  modulo k and the greatest common divisor function . It is known that every k-periodic arithmetic function has a representation as a finite discrete Fourier series of the form

where the Fourier coefficients  defined by the following equation are also k-periodic:

We are interested in the following k-periodic divisor sums:

It is a fact that the Fourier coefficients of these divisor sum variants are given by the formula

Fourier transforms of the GCD

We can also express the Fourier coefficients in the equation immediately above in terms of the Fourier transform of any function h at the input of  using the following result where  is a Ramanujan sum (cf. Fourier transform of the totient function):

Thus by combining the results above we obtain that

Sums over prime divisors

Let the function  denote the characteristic function of the primes, i.e.,  if and only if  is prime and is zero-valued otherwise. Then as a special case of the first identity in equation (1) in section interchange of summation identities above, we can express the average order sums

We also have an integral formula based on Abel summation for sums of the form 

where  denotes the prime-counting function. Here we typically make the assumption that the function f is continuous and differentiable.

Some lesser appreciated divisor sum identities

  
  
 
 If f is completely multiplicative then the pointwise multiplication  with a Dirichlet convolution yields .
 
 If  and n has more than m distinct prime factors, then

The Dirichlet inverse of an arithmetic function

The Dirichlet inverse of a function f satisfies  for all . There is a well-known recursive convolution formula for computing the Dirichlet inverse  of a function f by induction given in the form of 

For a fixed function f, let the function 

Next, define the following two multiple, or nested, convolution variants for any fixed arithmetic function f:

The function  by the equivalent pair of summation formulas in the next equation is closely related to the Dirichlet inverse for an arbitrary function f.

In particular, we can prove that 

This table makes precise the intended meaning and interpretation of this function as the signed sum of all possible multiple k-convolutions of the function f with itself.

Let  where p is the Partition function (number theory). Then there is another expression for the Dirichlet inverse given in terms of the functions above and the coefficients of the q-Pochhammer symbol for  given by

Variants of sums over arithmetic functions

See also 
 Summation
 Bell series
 List of mathematical series

Notes

References

Number theory
Integer sequences
Summability methods
Arithmetic